= Cécile Bomba Nkolo =

Minister of Social Affairs (Cameroon)
- In office 24 August 2002 – 8 December 2004

Member, Electoral Board of Elections Cameroon (ELECAM) (since 2008)

Personal details
- Born: Cécile Atangana Abene; 23 December 1951 (age 74) Douala, Littoral Region, Cameroon
- Education: University Centre for Health Sciences, University of Yaoundé
- Occupation: Physician; Politician
- Awards: Knight of the Order of Valour

Cécile Bomba Nkolo (née Cécile Atangana Abene; born 23 December 1951) is a Cameroonian physician and politician. She served as Minister of Social Affairs from 2002 to 2004 and since 2008 has been a member of the Electoral Board of Elections Cameroon (ELECAM).

== Early life and education ==
Cécile Bomba Nkolo was born on 23 December 1951 in Douala, in the Littoral Region of Cameroon. She is originally from the Centre Region of Cameroon. She obtained her Doctorate in Medicine in 1977 at the University Centre for Health Sciences (CUSS), University of Yaoundé. In 1989 she earned a Certificate of Competence in Family Planning from the Free University of Brussels (Université Libre de Bruxelles).

== Medical and public service career ==
After her medical studies, from 1977 to 1984 she worked as a physician in the pediatric unit of the Central Hospital of Yaoundé. From 1984 to 1989 she was Head of Service for Training and Further Training at the Ministry of Public Health; from 1989 to 1992 she served as Division Head for Training and Cooperation in the same ministry. Between 1998 and 2002 she was Director of Cooperation at the Ministry of Public Health.

== Political career ==
From 1992 to 1997, Bomba Nkolo served as a member of the National Assembly, where she was part of the Commission on Laws (Commission des Lois).

=== Minister of Social Affairs ===
On 24 August 2002, she was appointed Minister of Social Affairs (Ministre des Affaires Sociales), a position she held until 8 December 2004.

== Role in Elections Cameroon (ELECAM) ==
In 2008, Bomba Nkolo was named a member of the Electoral Board of ELECAM. Documents from later years (e.g. 2017, 2018) continue to list her among the members of the Electoral Board, indicating her continued service.

== Honours and distinctions ==
Cécile Bomba Nkolo has been awarded the ranks of Commander, Officer, and Knight of the Order of Valour (Ordre de la Valeur).

== Controversies / Criticism ==
Some critics and media sources have challenged the impartiality of ELECAM under its current composition; one article mentions Bomba Nkolo among members allegedly linked to controversial political positions upon their appointment in 2008.
